The College of Management Academic Studies, a college located in the city of Rishon LeZion, Israel, is the largest college in Israel. Founded in 1978, COLMAN is the first non-subsidized, not-for-profit research academic institution in Israel to be recognized and certified by the Council for Higher Education in Israel. It offers bachelor's and master's degrees in business administration, law, media, economics, organizational development and consulting, computer science, behavioral sciences, family studies and interior design. The college places an emphasis on social awareness and responsibility, encouraging both students and faculty to take part in communities and outreach activities.

History
The College of Management - Academic Studies  (COLMAN) gained authorization in 1986 to award a BA degree in business administration and accounting. COLMAN became the first non-subsidized, non-profit academic institution in Israel to be recognized and certified by the country's supreme educational authority, the Council for Higher Education in Israel. Official recognition of COLMANS’ status marked the democratization of Israeli higher education. Today, COLMAN is the largest college in Israel and has become a dynamic, innovative force in Israel's higher educational framework.

The Academic Studies has achieved its impressive growth because of its success in meeting a real need - the desire of young Israelis for a unique curricula that combines professional knowledge with practical application, close ties between faculty and students, and small classes.

Teaching and degrees
The Teaching Authority  was established to improve the quality of teaching at institutions of higher education in Israel in general, and at COLMAN in particular through various means, while developing tools to measure quality instruction. It encourages debate on the essence of academic teaching and its quality amongst the faculty and academic management.

The Research Authority aims to encourage research activity among the College schools and academic departments to aid faculty to locate research funds both in Israel and abroad and to prepare grant proposals.
The Authority encourages faculty to engage in both basic and applied research as an important element for the improvement of the quality of teaching, a stepping-stone for the personal academic advancement of the faculty and the placing of the College on the academic map in Israel and abroad.

Academic year
The academic year is divided into three terms lasts from October to January ; from February to May; and from June to September.

Libraries

Central library
The College of Management central library lies in Rishon LeZion campus since 1995. In the year 2010, inaugurated in its building dedicated to the library structure. The library serves the students and the academic ranks of the college.

Library building covers three floors and includes reading rooms housing collection of varies fields, work in group rooms, Daily Press Room, audiovisual room and a teaching class.
In the entry level  there is the lending books desk, display shelves displaying new books and journals, sitting areas and computerized seating positions. Copiers are placed on each floor near the elevator. Printers are located in each work in group room.

The library collection contains more than 80,000 volumes of books and copies of electronic media. The collection includes 450 journals in print, thousands of electronic journals, 40 databases, and publications of research institutes, newspapers, videotapes and DVDs.
The collection covers all topics included in undergraduate and graduated curricula: management, financing, marketing, accounting, operations management, economics, international trade, international organizations, behavioral science, criminology, organizational behavior, family studies, communication, computer science, interior design art and more. Books in the library are arranged by classification numbers representing the classification of areas and issues.

Law library
The law library was established in 1990, in 1995 it has moved to its new residence in the law school building on the Rishon LeZion campus.
The library has a key role in the academic teaching, research and activities taking place in law school and allowing large accessibility to legal information worldwide. At the entrance level, there is a reading hall containing reference books, sources files, Jewish law, multi-disciplinary collection, legislation and case law sets and display shelves displaying the latest journals.

The library has a comprehensive collection of library files legislation and case law from Israel and abroad, monographs and other areas related, law journals, legal series, encyclopedias, dictionaries and guides.
In addition to the printed collection, the library subscribed to a wide range of legal databases and others, including foreign legislation and case law, digital books and hundreds of electronic journals. These collections also can be accessed off-campus.

Faculties and Departments

Business Administration
The school of business is the largest in the country with an enrollment of approximately 3,500 students. It is the first private, non-state academic program ever officially accredited by the Council for Higher Education in Israel, Israel's accreditation authority for institutes of higher education.

Law
The Haim Striks School of Law  was founded by Daniel Friedmann (subsequently Minister of Justice)  in 1990. It offers both an LL.B. and a subsequent Master's program.

In 2005, as part of Englard report, prepared for the Council for Higher Education in order to Evaluate the Quality of Law Faculties in Israel, COMAS's Law School granted the highest ranking among the non-subsidized institutions and ranked as one of Israel's leading law schools.

The Haim Striks School of Law closely cooperates with leading universities in the United States and England such as Fordham University and University of Oxford.

Media Studies
The School is the largest school of Media Studies in the country catering to more than 50% of Israel's students of Media Studies. The School's B.A. program in Media Studies and Management integrates theoretical and practical knowledge.

Economics
The School of Economics was established in 1994, and in recent years has undergone accelerated growth and development. Today, it is one of the largest   departments in its field in Israel. It caters to 1,300 students for a BA in Economics and Management.

Computer Science
The Department of Computer Science is one of the largest and leading departments in its field in Israel.

Behavioral Sciences
The School of Behavioral Sciences at the College of Management was established in 1994 as a multidisciplinary department for studying psychology, sociology, and anthropology.

Interior Design
The Interior Design Department was founded in 1995 is a full academic track in interior design separate from architecture or design studies.

Alumni and academics
The Alumni Forum was established to cater for the College's 31,000 alumni. It aims to maintain the connection between the College and its graduates, to encourage contact between the graduates and to fulfill the needs of the alumni both academically and in the business and employment fields.

Office of International Programs
The College of Management - Academic Studies has an international office that works with students from several countries. There is also a student club for foreign and Israeli students on campus known as the International Student Community (ISC).

See also
List of universities and colleges in Israel
Education in Israel

References

External links
 College website
 Admissions website 

 
Educational institutions established in 1978
Colleges in Israel
1978 establishments in Israel
Law schools in Israel